Cloeodes is a genus of mayflies in the family Baetidae.

Species in this genus include:
 Cloeodes anduzei Traver, 1943
 Cloeodes auwe Salles & Batista, 2004
 Cloeodes aymore Massariol & Salles, 2011
 Cloeodes barituensis Nieto & Richard, 2008
 Cloeodes binocularis Needham & Murphy, 1924
 Cloeodes espinillo Nieto & Richard, 2008
 Cloeodes hydation McCafferty & Lugo-Ortiz, 1995
 Cloeodes incus Waltz & McCafferty, 1987
 Cloeodes irvingi Waltz & McCafferty, 1987
 Cloeodes itajara Massariol & Salles, 2011
 Cloeodes jaragua Salles & Lugo-Ortiz, 2003
 Cloeodes nocturnus Navas, 1923
 Cloeodes opacus Nieto & Richard, 2008
 Cloeodes penai Morihara & Edmunds, 1980
 Cloeodes redactus Waltz & McCafferty, 1987
 Cloeodes turbinopsis Needham & Morphy, 1924

References

Mayflies
Mayfly genera